Maggie Orth (born 1964, Columbus, OH) is an American artist and technologist who helped create the field of E-textiles.  
Her 2001 MIT Media Lab PhD thesis, Sculpted computational objects with smart and active computing materials and associated publications and patents  are among the early work in this field.  She was named a 2007 United States Artists Target Fellow.  The United States Artists foundation describes her as "A pioneer of electronic textiles, interactive fashions, wearable computing, and interface design".  She founded , which created e-textile products.

The team of Gorbett+Banerjee and Maggie Orth were commissioned to create   an interactive robotic sculpture, for the Mineta San Jose International airport.

References

External links
 Time Magazine article about Maggie Orth High-Tech Goes High-Touch: Fantastic Fabricator, Anita Hamilton, Time Magazine, Oct. 30, 2005
 Adafruit blog piece Maggie Orth's electronic textiles, Aug. 5 2013
 Interview with Maggie Fashion Sensing / Fashioning Sense: A conversation about aesthetics with International Fashion Machines' Maggie Orth, Anne Galloway, Horizon 0 magazine
 International Fashion Machines
 Maggie Orth Studio

Living people
21st-century American women artists
Massachusetts Institute of Technology alumni
Artists from Seattle
1964 births